Uncheon Station is the name of two railroad stations in South Korea.

 Uncheon station (Paju)
 Uncheon station (Gwangju)